Yoel Gustavo Juárez (born 20 March 2002) is an Argentine professional footballer who plays as a forward for Aldosivi.

Club career
Juárez was produced by the Independiente Mar del Plata and Aldosivi academies. At the age of sixteen, on 15 March 2019, Juárez made the move into senior football under manager Gustavo Álvarez, who selected the forward as a substitute for a Primera División match with Colón. He was subsequently subbed on in place of Alan Ruiz, featuring for the final twenty-four minutes of a 3–0 victory.

On 31 January 2021, Juárez was sent out on loan to Santamarina for the 2021 season.

International career
In July 2017, Juárez was called up by Diego Placente to train with the Argentina U15s. Two years later, Juárez represented Argentina under Placente at U17 level in Russia at the 2019 Granatkin Memorial. He made three appearances as they won the competition, beating the hosts in the final.

Career statistics
.

Honours
Argentina U17
Granatkin Memorial: 2019

References

External links

2002 births
Living people
Footballers from Buenos Aires
Argentine footballers
Argentina youth international footballers
Association football forwards
Argentine Primera División players
Aldosivi footballers
Club y Biblioteca Ramón Santamarina footballers